This article contains a list of heads of state of Paraguay, since the beginning of the independence (1811) to the present day.

Background
After Paraguay proclaimed independence from the Viceroyalty of the Río de la Plata, its first effective head of state was utopist José Gaspar Rodríguez de Francia, who ruled the country from 1814 until his death in 1840, with very little outside contact or influence.

Since the establishment of the office of President of the Republic in 1844, during the family dictatorship of the López family (1841–1870), Paraguay had 51 presidents. Between the end of the Paraguayan War in 1870 and the 1954 coup d'état, the country changed 44 presidents; 24 of them were removed from power by force. Eventually, Army General Alfredo Stroessner, supported by the Armed Forces and the right-wing Colorado Party, seized power in the 1954 coup d'état. Relying on the military and the party as the "twin pillars" of his rule, and ruling in the single-party system until 1962, Stroessner was elected for eight consecutive terms before being ousted from power in the 1989 coup d'état. His 35-year-long rule was one of the longest in history by a non-royal leader.

Non-presidential heads of state (1811–1844)

Presidents (1844–present)

Timeline

See also
 President of Paraguay
 History of Paraguay
 Politics of Paraguay

Notes

References

External links 
 Presidency of the Republic of Paraguay

Presidents of Paraguay
Presidents
Presidents
1844 establishments in Paraguay